The 1963–64 Southern Football League season was the 61st in the history of the league, an English football competition.

Yeovil Town won the championship, whilst Cheltenham Town, Folkestone Town, King's Lynn, and Tonbridge were all promoted to the Premier Division. Seven Southern League clubs applied to join the Football League at the end of the season, but none were successful.

Premier Division
The Premier Division consisted of 22 clubs, including 18 clubs from the previous season and four new clubs, promoted from Division One:
Hastings United
Hinckley Athletic
Margate
Nuneaton Borough

Also, Bexleyheath & Welling changed name to Bexley United.

League table

Division One
Division One consisted of 22 clubs, including 16 clubs from the previous season and six new clubs:
Three clubs relegated from the Premier Division:
Clacton Town
Gravesend & Northfleet
Poole Town

Plus:
Crawley Town, joined from the Metropolitan League
Deal Town, joined from the Aetolian League
Stevenage Town, joined from the Delphian League

Also, Tunbridge Wells United changed name to Tunbridge Wells Rangers.

At the end of the season, Yiewsley changed name to Hillingdon Borough, while Clacton Town switched to the Eastern Football League.

League table

Football League elections
Alongside the four League clubs facing re-election, a total of 13 non-League clubs applied for election, including seven Southern League clubs. All four League clubs were re-elected.

References
RSSF – Southern Football League archive

Southern Football League seasons
S